Adam Alamatovich Ismailov (born 1 May 1976) is a former Russian professional football player.

External links
 
 

1976 births
Living people
Russian footballers
Association football goalkeepers
FC Akhmat Grozny players
FC Dacia Chișinău players
FC Angusht Nazran players
Moldovan Super Liga players
Russian expatriate footballers
Expatriate footballers in Moldova